Déhérain is a surname. Notable people with the surname include:

Henri Dehérain (1867–1941), French historian and geographer
Herminie Déhérain (1798–1839), French painter
Pierre Paul Dehérain (1830–1902), French plant physiologist and agricultural chemist
Pierre de Hérain, born Pierre Déhérain, (1904–1972), French film director